Shooting at the 2024 Summer Paralympics will be held at Centre National de Tir Sportif de Châteauroux.

Qualification

Medalists

Men

Women

Mixed

See also
Shooting at the 2024 Summer Olympics

References

2024 Summer Paralympics events
2024
Paralympics
Paralympics